Sigifredo López Tobón (born 29 October 1963 in Pradera, Valle del Cauca, Colombia) is a lawyer and politician. While deputy in the administrative department of Valle del Cauca he was kidnapped by the Revolutionary Armed Forces of Colombia (FARC) in 2002. After surviving a massacre of 11 of his fellow deputies, also kidnapped, on 18 June 2007, he was released on February 5, 2009.

References

Living people
1963 births
People from Valle del Cauca Department